Ogden is both a surname and a given name. Notable people with the name include:

Ernie Ogden c 1900 - 1960.

Rugby League Second Rower played for Warrington and Leigh. Won a Lancashire Cup Medal with Warrington and was part of the team who defeated Australia. Had the nickname Dirty Oggy due his very tough manner on the field

Surname
Abner Nash Ogden (1809–1875), Justice of the Louisiana Supreme Court
Alan Ogden (born 1954), English professional footballer
Aaron Ogden, governor of New Jersey
Bud Ogden, American professional basketball player
Carlos C. Ogden, American Medal of Honor recipient
Charles Ogden (children's writer)
Charles Kay Ogden, Cambridge University linguist, inventor of Basic English
Charles Richard Ogden, Canadian politician
Charles W. Ogden (1873–1956), American real estate investor and philanthropist
David Ogden (disambiguation)
Darius A. Ogden (1813-1889), New York politician
Elias B. D. Ogden (1800-1865), Associate Justice of the New Jersey Supreme Court
Eric Ogden (politician), British politician
Eric Ogden (photographer), photographer
Frederick B. Ogden (1827-1893), 8th mayor of Hoboken, New Jersey
Graham Ogden (born 1938), Australian biblical scholar, theologian and priest
Heather Ogden, Canadian ballet dancer
Henry Alexander Ogden (1856-1936), American illustrator
Jack Ogden (jewellery historian), an archaeologist and historian focusing on the development of jewellery materials and techniques
Jack Ogden (rugby league), rugby league footballer of the 1940s and 1950s
James Ernest Ogden, Australian politician
James Matlock Ogden, American politician
Jeff Ogden, a former National Football League wide receiver
John Ogden (disambiguation)
Jonathan Ogden, American football offensive tackle
Jonathan Ogden (surgeon)
Jonathan Robert Ogden (1806–1882), English composer
Karen Ogden, Australian basketball player
Margaret Astrid Lindholm Ogden, American writer better known by her pen names Robin Hobb and Megan Lindholm
Marques Ogden, American football offensive tackle and center
Maureen Ogden (1928-2022), American politician
Michael Ogden (1926–2003), British lawyer
Nigel Ogden, British theatre organist
Perry Ogden (b. 1961), British fashion and documentary photographer and film director
Peter Ogden, one of the British founders of Computacenter
Peter Skene Ogden, Canadian explorer of the American West
Ralph Ogden, American professional basketball player
Robert Morris Ogden (1877-1959), American psychologist and academic
Roger L. Ogden broadcasting executive
Robert N. Ogden, Jr. (1839–1905), American politician and Confederate lieutenant colonel
Thomas Ogden, psychoanalyst and writer
Val Ogden, American politician
William Ogden (disambiguation)

Given name
Ogden L. Mills, American businessman and politician
Ogden Nash, American poet
Ogden R. Reid, a member of the United States House of Representatives
Ogden Rood, American physicist
Ogden Lindsley, American psychologist, founder of Precision Teaching

Fictional characters
Stan Ogden, in the British television series Coronation Street
Hilda Ogden, in the British television series Coronation Street; wife of Stan
Irma Ogden, in the British television series Coronation Street; daughter of Stan and Hilda
Trevor Ogden, in the British television series Coronation Street; son of Stan and Hilda
Pauline "Polly" Ogden, in the British television series Coronation Street; wife of Trevor
Damian Ogden, in the British television series Coronation Street; son of Trevor and Polly 
Dr. Julia Ogden, in the Canadian television series Murdoch Mysteries
Ogden Ford, title character of The Little Nugget by P. G. Wodehouse
Ogden Wernstrom, in the animated television series Futurama
Ogden Morrow, in the novel Ready Player One by Ernest Cline

See also
John Ogdon, pianist

English-language surnames